Travelling Man is a Granada TV series broadcast in the United Kingdom in 1984 and 1985. Created and written by Roger Marshall, one of the original writers of The Avengers, the series starred Leigh Lawson as Lomax and Lindsay Duncan as his girlfriend. Broadcast in the 9pm slot on ITV, the series drew audiences of up to 13.2 million. Each episode had its own story, within an overarching plot of Lomax searching for his missing son and hunting down those who framed him.

Series one
On his release from prison, Lomax finds his wife has emigrated and is suing him for divorce. His son Steve has gone missing. Returning to his beloved narrowboat, Harmony, Lomax embarks on a long search for his son - and for the man who framed him. He is pursued by the police, who have him under surveillance, various underworld figures, and a journalist named Robinson - all of whom believe that he has a hidden stash of drugs money and will lead them to it.

Series two
Robinson asks Max to look after his godchild, Billy. Max spends a weekend away from Harmony looking after a hotel, where the only guests are a mysterious couple. He is helping out in a pub, when a gang of motorcyclists are upset. Steve, his son, challenges him to prove his innocence and robs a betting shop. Unknowingly he upsets the local gang boss Jack Ormand. Max meets up with an ex-cellmate, 'Granny' Jackson. Max finally gets closer to finding the man who set him up. An ex-girlfriend gives him the name 'Len Martin', but he remains one step ahead.

A further run of thirteen episodes was commissioned but Leigh Lawson chose to leave, following an earlier disagreement with Granada which had refused to release him from his contract to take the lead role in Roman Polanski's film Pirates. Consequently, the cliffhanger ending of the final episode of series 2, which was intended to lead into series 3, had to be resolved with a brief voiceover on the closing credits by Terry Taplin.

Leigh Lawson as of 2010 has gone on record and said the main reasons for him not continuing into a third series were artistic. He was not happy with the fact it was being filmed on video, which it has to be said, does degrade sound and visual quality significantly in certain scenes. He also stated he was against one of the central story arcs being brought to a conclusion too early - namely the search for Lomax's son, Steve.

Background
Marshall drew on his previous writing, in particular Frank Marker, the private detective he co-created for the 1960s/1970s drama Public Eye. Lomax shares some of Marker’s traits and moral dilemmas, their good intentions compromised by their time in prison. Both men will be pre-judged about their actions and plans, based solely on their 'shady' pasts. Marshall wrote each episode himself, adding a sense of continuity to the self-contained episodes. The Macclesfield Canal and the Chirk Aqueduct on the Llangollen Canal were amongst the many locations used in the dramatisation of the waterway film sequences.

Cast 
 Leigh Lawson as Alan Lomax, Max.
 Terry Taplin as Robinson, a Fleet Street reporter
 Lindsay Duncan as Andrea
 Derek Newark as Det. Chief Supt. Sullivan
 Freddie Jones
 Meg Wynn Owen as Gwen Owen
 Sue Robinson as Karen
 Michael Feast - Naylor
 Lynne Miller - Chrissie
 John Bird as Jack Ormand
 Bobbie Brown as Muriel
 Alan Cumming
 Tony Doyle as Len Martin

Critique
Travelling Man has often been compared to the mid-1960s American series The Fugitive, on which it draws both structurally and thematically. While protagonist Alan Lomax is not actually 'on the run', having served his time, it is clear from the start that the authorities still believe him guilty. While The Fugitive leaned heavily on the open landscapes of America, Travelling Man is set in the drug-infested world of the mid-1980s and in a location which adds a uniquely English slant to the fugitive subgenre: the canals and inland waterways of Britain. Although providing Lomax with both a home and a means of transport, the canals also exude a sense of quiet menace. There is an advantage, as he wryly observes in the opening episode: "One thing about quiet waterways, you can hear footsteps." For many viewers, the canal network offered an unfamiliar environment, a sense of ‘otherness’, cut-off from the modern world, reinforcing the impression of Lomax as both an outsider and an alternative hero. In addition, the slower pace allows Lomax time to explore other people’s narratives and provides his pursuers ample opportunity to spy on him and follow him at their leisure. Following the Western idea, Lomax’s boat Harmony represents his faithful horse and his wagon.

Soundtrack
In 1984–85 Browne composed and performed the music for the British television series Travelling Man, in collaboration with the programme's producer Sebastian Graham-Jones. The soundtrack was released on vinyl and CD as Travelling Man - The Music from the Granada TV series. The track reached number 68 in the UK Singles Chart in December 1984.

DVD release
The series has since been made available on DVD by Network and includes a short critical guide written by Marshall's son.

References

External links

1984 British television series debuts
1985 British television series endings
1980s British drama television series
ITV television dramas
Television shows set in Manchester
Television shows produced by Granada Television
Television series by ITV Studios
English-language television shows